The Vilna Edition of the Talmud, printed in Vilna (now Vilnius), Lithuania, is by far the most common printed edition of the Talmud still in use today as the basic text for Torah study in yeshivas and by all scholars of Judaism.

It was typeset by the Widow Romm and Brothers of Vilna.  This edition comprises 37 volumes and contains the entire Babylonian Talmud. In its entirety there are 2,711 double sided folio pages. It follows the typical pagination due to Bomberg of printing with the Gemara and/or Mishnah centered with Rashi's commentary on the inner margin and Tosafot on the outer margin. It is also flanked by other various marginal notations from various prominent Talmudists. This edition was first printed in the 1870s and 1880s, but it continues to be reproduced photomechanically all around the world.

History
Plans for publication of the Vilna Shas were announced in 1834 by the owners of the Vilna-Horadna Press, Menachem Man Ream and Simcha Zimmel. Along with a copyright, a restriction was placed on publishing another Shas for twenty years.

A rival edition of the Talmud, the Slavuta Shas, had been published almost three decades earlier, in 1807. The publishers of the Slavuta Talmud argued that the Vilna Edition infringed on their rabbinical court-ordered 25-year license to be the sole publishers of the text. Although more than 25 years had passed since the date of the first edition of the Slavuta Shas, only 21 years had passed after its latest edition.

References

External links
 Publishing Houses in Vilna in the Interwar Period on the Yad Vashem website
 The Story of the Romm Publishing House and the Vilna Shas

Jews and Judaism in Vilnius
Talmud versions and translations
Judaism in Lithuania
History of Vilnius
Jewish printing and publishing